This is a list of Spanish television related events in 2000.

Events 
 23 April: Telecinco premieres Big Brother, a true mass phenomenon, which will open a debate on the ethical limits of television. Reality shows will become the most viewed TV shows for the next two decades.
 12 May: Javier González Ferrari is appointed General Director of RTVE.

Debuts

Television shows

Ending this year

Foreign series debuts in Spain

Births 
 19 March - Carlota García, actress.

Deaths 
 28 April - Miguel Armario, actor, 84.
 24 May - Arturo López, actor, 66.
 5 July - Blanca Álvarez, hostess, 70.
 7 July - Felipe Mellizo, journalist, 67.
 16 October - Antonio Ferrandis, actor, 79.
 26 October - Jesús Puente, actor and host, 69.

See also
2000 in Spain
List of Spanish films of 2000

References 

2000 in Spanish television